Markus Wolff is a German born American artist, musician and writer.

An original member of Crash Worship, Pure, and collaborator with A Minority Of One, Blood Axis, L'Acéphale and several others, Wolff has produced works of art, sculptures, graphic design and music since the late 80's.

As a writer, he contributes to the journal Tyr and one of the editors of Hex Magazine.

His creative musical works are collectively known as Waldteufel, a name taken from Emile Waldteufel.

He currently resides in Portland, Oregon.

Discography

Albums and EPs

References

 Diesel, Andreas, & Gerten, Dieter. (2005). Looking for Europe: Neofolk und Hintergründe. Germany: Zeltingen-Rachtig.

External links

Official
Waldteufel on myspace.com

Interviews
Waldteufel Interview at Heathen Harvest

American folk musicians
Living people
Year of birth missing (living people)